The women's 500 m track time trial at the 2006 Dutch National Track Championships in Alkmaar took place at Sportpaleis Alkmaar on December 28, 2006. Seven athletes participated in the contest

Willy Kanis won the gold medal, Lianne Wagtho took silver and Sigrid Jochems won the bronze.

Competition format
Because of the number of entries, there was not a qualification round for this discipline. Consequently, the event was run direct to the final.

Final results

References

2006 Dutch National track cycling championships
Dutch National Track Championships – Women's 500 m time trial
Dutch